The Tropidostoma Assemblage Zone is a tetrapod assemblage zone or biozone which correlates to the lower Teekloof Formation, Adelaide Subgroup of the Beaufort Group, a fossiliferous and geologically important geological Group of the Karoo Supergroup in South Africa. Its northernmost exposures occur west/north-west of Colesberg. The Tropidostoma Assemblage Zone is the fourth biozone of the Beaufort Group.

The name of the biozone refers to Tropidostoma microtrema, a herbivorous dicynodont therapsid. This biozone is characterized by the presence of this species in association with another dicynodont species, Endothiodon uniseries.

History 
The first fossils to be found in the Beaufort Group rocks that encompass the current eight biozones were discovered by Andrew Geddes Bain in 1856. However, it was not until 1892 that it was observed that the geological strata of the Beaufort Group could be differentiated based on their fossil taxa. The initial undertaking was done by Harry Govier Seeley who subdivided the Beaufort Group into three biozones, which he named (from oldest to youngest):
 Zone of "Pareiasaurians"
 Zone of "Dicynodonts"
 Zone of "highly specialized group of theriodonts"

These proposed biozones Seeley named were subdivided further by Robert Broom between 1906 and 1909. Broom proposed the following biozones (from oldest to youngest):
 Pareiasaurus beds
 Endothiodon beds
 Kistecephalus beds
 Lystrosaurus beds
 Procolophon beds
 Cynognathus beds

The current stratigraphic range of the Tropidostoma Assemblage Zone was previously included within the Endothiodon beds ascribed by Broom. Decades later between the 1970s and early 1990s, Keyser and Smith  collaborated on several field trips into known outcrop areas in order to re-evaluate the fossil biostratigraphy. After relevant fossil taxa data had been collected, the biozone was renamed the Tropidostoma Assemblage Zone due to the discovery that Tropidostoma fossils were only found within the confines of a certain area.

Lithology 
The Tropidostoma Assemblage Zone correlates with the lower Teekloof Formation, Adelaide Subgroup of the Beaufort Group. This biozone is considered to be early Late Permian in age. The rock composition of this biozone is dominated by mudstones and siltstones, ranging from greenish-grey, grey, and dark reddish brown in colour. The mudstones and siltstones, measuring approximately 3 m thick in most outcrops and exposures, frequently contain calcareous or micritic nodule horizons and rhizocretions. Sheet-type single-storied channel sandstones are also found, the lower portion of the biozone often containing fining upward sequences. Calcium carbonate precipitation crusts and gypsum “desert rose” crystals have been uncovered in the sandstone layers.

The preserved rocks show that the depositional environment of this biozone was formed in a lacustrine and overbank environment, which flowed northwards in long, meandering rivers. This low energy environment is conducive for preferential deposition of finer sediment types which formed the mudstone and siltstone deposits. However, the climate was seasonally dry due to the presence of calcium carbonate precipitation in the sandstones. Coarser clastic material was only deposited during seasonal floods. The meandering rivers flowed from a foreland basin that was being formed from the rising of the Gondwanide mountains in the south. The Gondwanides were the result of crustal uplift that had previously begun to take course due to tectonic activity. The pressure of the growing Gondwanides mountain chain caused the formation of the Karoo Basin where the deposits of the Tropidostoma Assemblage zone, and all other succeeding assemblage zone deposits, were deposited over tens of millions of years.

Paleontology 
Vertebrate fossils of the Tropidostoma Assemblage Zone are predominantly found in the thick mudstone and siltstone sequences. Fossils are often encrusted within the calcareous or micritic nodules. The biozone is characterized by the presence of Tropidostoma in association with Endothiodon. However, the occurrence of these taxa are fairly rare in this biozone and their presence is characterized together with the more numerous fossils of the dicynodont species Pristerodon and Diictodon. Diictodon fossils are particularly ubiquitous in this biozone with isolated skull and post-cranial material being most commonly found. In the lower deposits, complete fossil skeletons of Diictodon are more commonly found, often in pairs and curled up together. These intriguing paired Diictodon fossils are invariably recovered from the bottom of helical burrow casts, which have been attributed to Diictodon. The helical burrows - a generally accepted feature of the Tropidostoma Assemblage Zone - are vertical, spiralling tubes measuring just under 1 m in length. The burrows are found infilled with either fine sandstone or siltstone with calcareous concretions. The burrows were likely infilled during single flood events, suddenly trapping and burying the Diictodon pairs inside alive. This provides an explanation for the near perfect preservation of the Diictodon pairs found in the burrow casts.

Other notable fossil material from the Tropidostoma Assemblage Zone includes the first appearance of larger gorgonopsid species such as Lycaenops ornatus, Cyonosaurus longiceps, and Gorgonops torvus. It is noted that gorgonopsians take over from the basal therocephalians as the top predators from this biozone through to the end of the Permian period. However, smaller therocephalian species such as Ictidosuchoides longiceps remained present. The cynodont species Procynosuchus delaharpeae has been recovered from the upper sections of this biozone. Dicynodont species diversified greatly in this biozone, a speciation trend that continued with this group until the end of the Permian period. A pareiasaur species, Pareiasaurus serridens, various subspecies of the temnospondyl amphibian Rhinesuchus, the fishes Namaichthys and Atherstonia, and fossil plant material of Glossopteris and Dadoxylon have been found. Finally, vertebrate burrows left by Diictodon as previously discussed, vertebrate trackways left by various therapsid species, and coprolites have been recovered.

References

See also 

 List of synapsids

South African assemblage zones
Permian South Africa
Lopingian